Renee Taylor (born 28 September 1996) is an Australian field hockey player.

Taylor was born in Everton Park, Queensland and made her senior international debut in a test series against China in April 2015.

Taylor was part of the Australian women's junior national team, 'The Jillaroos', that won bronze at the 2016 Hockey Junior World Cup in Chile.

Taylor qualified for the Tokyo 2020 Olympics. She was part of the Hockeyroos Olympics squad. The Hockeyroos lost 1-0 to India in the quarterfinals and therefore were not in medal contention.

References

External links
 
 
 

1996 births
Living people
Australian female field hockey players
Commonwealth Games medallists in field hockey
Commonwealth Games silver medallists for Australia
Female field hockey defenders
Field hockey players at the 2018 Commonwealth Games
Field hockey players at the 2022 Commonwealth Games
Field hockey players at the 2020 Summer Olympics
Olympic field hockey players of Australia
20th-century Australian women
21st-century Australian women
Sportspeople from Brisbane
Sportswomen from Queensland
Medallists at the 2018 Commonwealth Games
Medallists at the 2022 Commonwealth Games